Grindane is a mountain in Vang Municipality in Innlandet county, Norway. The mountain is surrounded by several other notable mountains including Tverrfjellet, Skoddetinden, and Kljåkinnknippene to the west; Øyre and Ørnenosi to the southwest; Storebotteggi, Klanten, and Rankonosi to the south; and Blåkampen to the southeast.

See also
List of mountains of Norway by height

References

Vang, Innlandet
Mountains of Innlandet